Olav Benum (5 September 1897 – 27 June 1990) was a Norwegian elected official and politician with the Liberal Party.

Biography
He was born at Beitstad in Nord-Trøndelag, Norway.

He was elected to the Norwegian Parliament from Nord-Trøndelag in 1945, and was re-elected on three occasions. He had previously served as a deputy representative during the term 1937–1945.

Benum was deputy mayor of Vemundvik municipal council in 1934–1937, and mayor in 1937–1941 and 1945. At the same time he was a member of Nord-Trøndelag county council. He later became a member of Namsos city council during the terms 1963–1967 and 1967–1971. Again, during the same time he became involved in the county council. He served as deputy county mayor in 1963–1966 and county mayor in 1966–1967.

Outside politics he worked as an agronomist. In the Norwegian Agrarian Association he was a member of the board from 1946 to 1953. From 1942 to 1945, during the German occupation of Norway, he fled to Stockholm, Sweden and worked at the Norwegian legation there.

References

Other sources

1897 births
1990 deaths
People from Nord-Trøndelag
Norwegian College of Agriculture alumni
Members of the Storting
Liberal Party (Norway) politicians
Mayors of places in Nord-Trøndelag
Chairmen of County Councils of Norway
20th-century Norwegian politicians